Pietrasze may refer to the following places:
 Pietrasze, Giżycko County in Warmian-Masurian Voivodeship (north Poland)
 Pietrasze, Gołdap County in Warmian-Masurian Voivodeship (north Poland)
 Pietrasze, Olecko County in Warmian-Masurian Voivodeship (north Poland)